Kotlabaea is a genus of fungi in the family Pyronemataceae.

The genus name of Kotlabaea is in honour of František Kotlaba (1927–2020) was a Czech botanist and mycologist.

The genus was circumscribed by Mirko Svrček in Ceská Mykol. vol.23 on page 85 in 1969.

The GBIF lists the following species;
 Kotlabaea alutacea 
 Kotlabaea delectans 
 Kotlabaea macrospora 
 Kotlabaea spaniosa

References

External links
Index Fungorum

Pyronemataceae
Pezizales genera